The following is a list of some notable species of the agaric genus Amanita. This genus contains over 500 named species and varieties, but the list is far from exhaustive. The list follows the classification of subgenera and sections of Amanita outline by Corner and Bas; Bas, as used by Tulloss (2007) and modified by Redhead & al. (2016) for Amanita subgenus Amanitina and Singer for Amanita section Roanokenses. Bolding of the species name and an asterisk (*) following indicates the species is the type species of that section, with a double asterisk (**) indicating the type species of the entire genus. The use of common names follows Tulloss (2007), Holden (2003), Arora (1986), and Lincoff (1981).

Subgenus Amanita

Section Amanita

 Amanita albocreata – (North America)
 Amanita aliena – (south Brazil)
 Amanita altipes – (southwestern China)
 Amanita aprica – (North America)
 Amanita armeniaca – gypsy amanita (Australia)
 Amanita augusta – USA
 Amanita breckonii – western USA
 Amanita chrysoblema
 Amanita eliae – (Europe)
 Amanita farinosa – (eastern North America to Central America)
 Amanita frostiana – Frost's amanita (eastern North America)
 Amanita gemmata – gemmed mushroom, jewelled amanita (Europe)
 Amanita gioiosa (Italy)
 Amanita ibotengutake – Japanese Ringed-Bulb Amanita (Japan)
 Amanita multisquamosa - Small Funnel-Veil Amanita (eastern North America)
 Amanita muscaria ** – fly agaric (cosmopolitan)
 Amanita nehuta – Maori dust Amanita (New Zealand)
 Amanita orientigemmata (Japan)
 Amanita parcivolvata – False Caesar, False Fly Agaric
 Amanita pantherina – panther mushroom, panther cap (Northern Hemisphere)
 Amanita parvipantherina – (Yunnan province, southwestern China)
 Amanita persicina – Peach-Colored Fly Agaric
 Amanita petalinivolva – (Brazil)
 Amanita regalis – royal fly agaric (Europe, Alaska)
 Amanita roseotincta – North America
 Amanita rubrovolvata – red volva amanita (Asia)
 Amanita velatipes – (eastern North America)
 Amanita virgineoides – white-colored (Japan)
 Amanita viscidolutea – (Brazil)
 Amanita wellsii – salmon amanita (North America)
 Amanita xanthocephala – vermillion grisette (Australia)

Section Vaginatae

 Amanita arctica (Greenland and Norway)
 Amanita argentea (=Amanita mairei) – (Europe)
 Amanita battarrae (=Amanita umbrinolutea) – umber-zoned ringless amanita (Europe)
 Amanita beckeri – Becker's Ringless Amanita (Europe)
 Amanita betulae (Europe)
 Amanita ceciliae (=Amanita inaurata) – Cecilia's ringless amanita, snakeskin grisette (Europe)
 Amanita crocea – orange grisette, saffron ringless amanita (Europe)
 Amanita flavescens – (Sweden and Norway)
 Amanita fuligineodisca – (from Honduras to Andean Colombia)
 Amanita fulva – tawny grisette, orange-brown ringless amanita (Europe)
 Amanita groenlandica – (Greenland and Northern Europe)
 Amanita liquii – (southwestern China)
 Amanita lividopallescens – (Europe)
 Amanita mairei – René Maire's Ringless Amanita (Mediterranean basin)
 Amanita nivalis – mountain grisette, snow ringless amanita (Arctic/Alpine)
 Amanita olivaceogrisea – (Europe)
 Amanita orientifulva – (southwestern China)
 Amanita pachycolea – Stuntz' great ringless amanita, western grisette (western North America)
 Amanita pekeoides – Maori's sack ringless Amanita (New Zealand)
 Amanita protecta – (California)
 Amanita rhacopus – (North America)
 Amanita sinicoflava – North America
 Amanita submembranacea – (Europe)
 Amanita subnudipes – (Europe)
 Amanita umbrinolutea – (Europe)
 Amanita vaginata * – grisette (Europe, North America)
 Amanita velosa – springtime amanita, coral to peachy pink ringless amanita (western North America)

Section Caesareae

 Amanita arkansana – (USA)
 Amanita basii – (Mexico)
 Amanita calyptratoides – (Mexico)
 Amanita calyptroderma – (Mexico)
 Amanita caesarea * – Caesar's mushroom, caesar, royal amanita (southern Europe)
 Amanita caesareoides  – Asian Vermilion Slender Caesar (South-East Asia)
 Amanita chepangiana – (South-East Asia)
 Amanita hemibapha (species complex) – half-dyed slender Caesar (Pantropical)
 Amanita kitamagotake – Becker's ringless amanita (Japan)
 Amanita jacksonii – Jackson's slender caesar, American Caesar (eastern North America)
 Amanita lanei (=Amanita calyptrata) – coccora, coccoli (western North America)
 Amanita princeps – head man slender Caesar (southeastern Asia)
 Amanita spreta – hated amanita, hated Caesar (eastern North America)
 Amanita yema – Yolk-Colored Caesar (Mexico)
 Amanita zambiana – Zambian slender Caesar (Africa)

Subgenus Amanitina

Section Phalloideae

 Amanita arocheae – Latin American death cap (Central/South America)
 Amanita bisporigera – destroying angel (eastern North America)
 Amanita elliptosperma – Atkinson's Destroying Angel (North America)
 Amanita exitialis – Guangzhou destroying angel (southern China)
 Amanita fuliginea – East Asian Brown Death Cap (Japan, China)
 Amanita gayana – Gay's Death Cap
 Amanita griseorosa
 Amanita hesleri  – Hesler's Lepidella (eastern North America)
 Amanita hygroscopica Coker – "Pink-Gilled Destroying Angel," possibly synonymous with Amanita elliptosperma
 Amanita magnivelaris – great felt skirt destroying angel (eastern North America)
 Amanita marmorata
 Amanita manginiana – Chiu's false death cap (East Asia)
 Amanita marmorata subsp. myrtacearum – marbled death cap (Hawaii)
 Amanita moliuscula
 Amanita ocreata – destroying angel, death angel (western North America)
  Amanita pallidorosea
  Amanita parviexitialis
 Amanita phalloides * – death cap (cosmopolitan)
 Amanita pseudoporphyria – Hongo's false death cap (East & South Asia)
  Amanita rimosa
  Amanita suballiacea
  Amanita subfuliginea
 Amanita subjunquillea – east Asian death cap (East & Southeast Asia)
 Amanita veldiei - Veldie's Lepidella (South Africa)
 Amanita verna – fool's mushroom (southern Europe)
 Amanita virosa – destroying angel (Europe)
 Amanita virosiformis – narrow-spored destroying angel (Florida)
  Amanita subpallidorosea
 Amanita volvarielloides – (Australia)

Section Validae

 Amanita aestivalis – white American star-footed Amanita (North America)
 Amanita australis – far south Amanita (New Zealand)
 Amanita brunnescens – brown American star-footed Amanita, cleft-footed amanita (North America)
 Amanita brunneolocularis – Mesoamerican Dark Volva Blusher (Colombia, Costa Rica, Honduras)
 Amanita canescens – Golden Threads Lepidella (North America)
 Amanita citrina – false death cap (Europe)
 Amanita elongata - Peck's Yellow Dust Amanita
 Amanita excelsa
 Amanita excelsa var. excelsa * (=Amanita excelsa var. valida) – (Europe)
 Amanita excelsa var. spissa * (=Amanita spissa) – grey-spotted amanita, European false blusher (Europe)
 Amanita flavella – orange Amanita, Australian yellow-dust amanita (Australia)
 Amanita flavipes
 Amanita flavoconia – yellow patches, yellow wart, American yellow-dust amanita (eastern North America)
 Amanita flavorubens – yellow blusher (eastern North America)
 Amanita franchetii (= Amanita aspera) – yellow-veiled amanita (Europe, North America)
 Amanita luteofusca - Thorn-Bush Amanita (Australia)
 Amanita nothofagi - southern beech Amanita (New Zealand)
 Amanita novinupta – western blusher, blushing bride (western North America)
 Amanita porphyria – purple-brown Amanita, porphyry amanita (Europe)
 Amanita rubescens – European blusher, golmotte (Europe and eastern North America)
 Amanita solaniolens – old potato amanita (Nova Scotia, Canada)

Section Roanokenses

 Amanita abrupta – American abrupt-bulbed Lepidella (North America)
 Amanita atkinsoniana
 Amanita austroviridis (Australia) – Australian verdigris Lepidella
 Amanita ananiceps – White-veiled Lepidella, Australian pineapple Lepidella (Australia)
 Amanita carneiphylla
 Amanita chlorinosma – Chlorine Lepidella (eastern North America)
 Amanita cinereovelata – northern Bangladesh
 Amanita cokeri – Coker's Lepidella
 Amanita daucipes – Carrot-foot Lepidella, turnip-foot Amanita
 Amanita kotohiraensis– Kotohira Lepidella
 Amanita lesueurii - Lesueur's Lepidella (southwestern Australia)
 Amanita longipes – Dog-Legged Lepidella
 Amanita macrocarpa – South China
 Amanita magniverrucata – Great-warted Lepidella
 Amanita mutabilis – Anise And Raspberry Limbed-Lepidell
 Amanita neoovoidea – (Asia)
 Amanita ochrophylla
 Amanita ochrophylloides
 Amanita onusta – Loaded Lepidella, gunpowder Lepidella
 Amanita ovoidea – bearded amanita, European egg amidella (southern Europe)
 Amanita polypyramis
 Amanita pyramidifera - Pyramid Builder Lepidella (Australia)
 Amanita ravenelii – (North America) Pinecone Lepidella
 Amanita rhopalopus – (North America) American Club-Footed Lepidella
 Amanita sculpta
 Amanita smithiana – Smith's Lepidella (western North America)
 Amanita solitaria or Amanita echinocephala  – European solitary Lepidella (Europe)
 Amanita sphaerobulbosa – Asian abrupt-bulbed Lepidella (eastern Asia)
 Amanita strobiliformis – warted amanita (Europe)
 Amanita westii

Section Amidella

 Amanita chepangiana – (Asia)
 Amanita curtipes – (southern Europe)
 Amanita gilbertii – (France & Germany)
 Amanita lepiotoides – (southern Europe)
 Amanita ovoidea
 Amanita ponderosa – (southern Europe)
 Amanita proxima – (southern Europe)
 Amanita volvata * – American amidella (eastern North America)

Subgenus Lepidella (= Saproamanita)

Section Lepidella (= Saproamanita) 
 Amanita inopinata – Unexpected Guest Lepidella (New Zealand, western Europe)
 Amanita nauseosa
 Amanita prairiicola – American Prairie Lepidella
 Amanita thiersii – Thiers' Lepidella (eastern North America)
 Amanita vittadinii – Barefoot Amanita, Vittadini's Lepidella (southern Europe)

Unknown subgenus (incertae sedis)
 Amanita galactica (South America)

References

External links 
 Arora D. (1986). Mushrooms demystified (2nd ed). Berkeley, CA: Ten Speed Press. 
 Holden EM. (2003). Recommended English Names for Fungi in the UK
 Lincoff GH. (1981). The Audubon Society field guide to North American mushrooms. New York: Alfred A. Knopf. 
 Tulloss RE. (2007). "The genus Amanita Pers. (Agaricales, Fungi)" (website)

Amanita